John Hyams is an American screenwriter, director and cinematographer, best known for his involvement in the Universal Soldier series, for which he has directed two installments. Hyams is the son of director Peter Hyams.

Career

Hyams graduated from Syracuse University School of Visual and Performing Arts, becoming a noted painter and sculptor exhibiting and selling work in New York and Los Angeles. He became known in Hollywood in 1997 after writing, producing, and directing the critically acclaimed One Dog Day. The film debuted at the Taos Talking Picture Film Festival. After that, Hyams directed several documentaries, most notably The Smashing Machine, which follows the life of fighter Mark Kerr. Hyams also directed several episodes of ABC Television's NYPD Blue.

In 2009, Hyams took over the Universal Soldier franchise, directing the film Regeneration, starring Jean-Claude Van Damme and Dolph Lundgren. It was shot mostly in Bulgaria on a budget of $9 million. Then, in 2012, he wrote and produced a sequel called Day of Reckoning, which also featured Van Damme and Lundgren. It was shot in 3D with a budget of $8 million.

Over the course of 2014 and 2015, Hyams directed several episodes of the horror series Z Nation, including the pilot.  Hyams has also directed for numerous other TV series, including Chicago P.D., Chicago Fire, and Chucky, and acted as showrunner for the Z Nation spin-off Black Summer. In 2018 he returned to feature work with the independent comedy-drama All Square, starring Michael Kelly. In 2020 he directed the thriller Alone, and in 2022 the Kevin Williamson-scripted, Blumhouse-produced horror film Sick.

Filmography

Films

Television 
The numbers in directing and writing credits refer to the number of episodes.

References

External links 
 

Living people
American film directors
Film producers from New York (state)
American male screenwriters
American people of Russian-Jewish descent
American television directors
Jewish American screenwriters
Syracuse University alumni
Year of birth missing (living people)
Place of birth missing (living people)
Screenwriters from New York (state)
21st-century American Jews